The National Center for Biomedical Ontology (NCBO) is one of the National Centers for Biomedical Computing, and is funded by the NIH.  Among the goals of the NCBO are to provide tools for discovery and access of biomedical ontologies, which are a type of controlled vocabulary designed to allow the expression of complex relationships in machine-readable form. 

The NCBO has facilities at Stanford University, the Mayo Clinic, the University of Victoria, and the University at Buffalo.

Among the products associated with the NCBO are the Open Biomedical Ontologies.

References

External links
 NCBO Web Site
 Bioontology wiki
National Institutes of Health
Medical and health organizations based in California
Medical research institutes in the United States